Orizare is a village in southeast Bulgaria, situated in Obshtina Nessebar, in the Burgas region.

Villages in Burgas Province